Rana el Kaliouby (born 1978) is an Egyptian-American computer scientist and entrepreneur in the field of expression recognition research and technology development, which is a subset of facial recognition designed to identify the emotions expressed by the face. El Kaliouby's research moved beyond the field's dependence on exaggerated or caricatured expressions modeled by laboratory actors, to focus on the subtle glances found in real situations. She is the co-founder, with Rosalind Picard, and CEO of Affectiva.

A pioneer in Artificial Intelligence as well as the co-founder and CEO of Affectiva, an AI startup spun off from the MIT Media Lab. After growing up in Cairo, Egypt, she earned a PhD in Cambridge University, and then joined the MIT Media Lab as a research scientist, where she spearheaded the application of emotion recognition technology in a variety of fields, including mental health and autism. She left MIT to co-found Affectiva, a company credited with defining the field of Emotion AI and now works with 25% of the Fortune 500 and is a leader in emotion AI.  Rana was named by Forbes to their list of America's Top 50 Women in Tech, and Fortune included her in their list of 40 under 40 and was chosen by the World Economic Forum to be a Young Global Leader and member of WEF's Future Global Council on Robotics and Artificial Intelligence. She speaks regularly on ethics in AI and fighting bias in AI at conferences from the Aspen Ideas Festival to the Wall Street Journal’s Future of Everything. She hosted a PBS Nova.

Rana el Kaliouby is on a mission to humanize technology with artificial emotional intelligence, or what she calls “Emotion AI.” through developing a “deep learning” platform that combines facial expression with tone of voice to infer how a person is feeling.  She is the author of "Girl Decoded: A scientist's quest to reclaim humanity by bringing emotional intelligence to technology".

Education

El Kaliouby earned a bachelor's degree and Master of Science degree from the American University in Cairo, then a Ph.D. at Newnham College, Cambridge.

Career

El Kaliouby worked as a research scientist at Massachusetts Institute of Technology, helping to found their Autism & Communication Technology Initiative. Her original goal was to improve human-computer interaction, but she quickly became fascinated with the possibility of applying this technology to improve human-human communication, especially for autistic people, many of whom struggle with emotional communication. At the Affective Computing group of MIT Media Lab, she was part of a team that pioneered development of the "emotional hearing aid", a set of emotion-reading wearable glasses which the New York Times included in their Top 100 innovations of 2006. El Kaliouby demonstrates her work and is interviewed in the 2018 documentary on artificial intelligence Do You Trust This Computer?

El Kaliouby has stated that computers, while good with information, fall short when it comes to determining feelings, thus requiring manual prompting to respond to an operator's needs. Her work primarily lies in the subtle facial changes that people tend to make. She has identified 24 landmarks to the face, each moving in different ways, depending on an expressed emotion. This has many applications, from linguistics to video production.  Autism patients, who typically have a different array of expressions that are apart from the norm, may be able to have their moods more easily monitored by parents or caretakers. For production purposes, computer generated imagery of faces (and presumably android projects) will be able to be more realistic in the art of subtlety.

Leading Affectiva's Emotion Science team; the company applies computer vision, machine learning and data science to leverage the company's facial emotion repository, which has now grown to nearly 6 million faces analyzed in 75 countries with 5,313,751 face videos, for a total of 38,944 hours of data, representing nearly 2 billion facial frames analyzed, to understand people's feelings and behaviors.

In 2016, she became the CEO of Affectiva.

In November 2019, Affectiva was covered as a case study at Harvard Business School on the Emotion AI category with Professor Shane Greenstein.

Awards and recognition

El Kaliouby was inducted into the "Women in Engineering" Hall of Fame. She is also a member of ACM, IEEE, Association of Children's Museums, British Machine Vision Association, and Nahdet el Mahrousa. Other awards include:

 7 Women to Watch in 2014 – Entrepreneur Magazine
 Mass High Tech Top 20 Women to Watch 2014
 The Wired Smart List – Wired 2013
 MIT TR35 2012
 Smithsonian Magazine American Ingenuity Award in Technology
 Forbes America's Top 50 Women In Tech 2018
 BBC 100 Women in 2019

Books 
El Kaliouby's memoir Girl Decoded was published in April 2020.

El Kaliouby also contributed one chapter to the 2018 book Architects of Intelligence: The Truth About AI from the People Building it by the American futurist Martin Ford.

See also
List of Egyptian scientists

References

External links

 
 "This app knows how you feel — from the look on your face" (TEDWomen 2015)
 When algorithms grow accustomed to your face | Nov. 2013 – New York Times.
 25 Most Audacious Companies | April 2013 – Inc.
 The New Face of AdTech Goes Consumer | Aug 2012 – TechCrunch.
 Does Your Phone Know How Happy You Are? | June 2012 – Fast Company.

1978 births
Living people
American women engineers
American people of Egyptian descent
Egyptian computer scientists
Egyptian women computer scientists
Alumni of Newnham College, Cambridge
Place of birth missing (living people)
MIT Media Lab people
BBC 100 Women
American bioengineers
21st-century American women